{{DISPLAYTITLE:C5H9NO}}
The molecular formula C5H9NO may refer to:

 3-Dimethylaminoacrolein
 2-Ethyl-2-oxazoline
 N-Methyl-2-pyrrolidone
 N-Methyl-4-pyrrolidone
 4-Piperidinone
 2-Piperidinone